Petry, or Pétry, is a surname. Notable people with the surname include:
 Ann Petry (1908–1997), American author
 August Arthur Petry (1858–1932), German botanist and entomologist
 Cássio Petry (born 1978), Brazilian canoeist
 Christian Petry (born 1965), German politician
 Dan Petry (born 1958), American baseball player
 Ellen Petry Leanse (1958), American author, businesswoman, coach, educator, entrepreneur, and online community pioneer
 Frauke Petry (born 1975), German chemist, businesswoman and politician (AfD)
 Irène Pétry (1922–2007), Belgian judge and socialist politician.
 Jeff Petry (born 1987), American ice hockey player
 Juliusz Petry (1890–1961), Polish writer
 Lasse Petry (born 1992), Danish footballer
 Leroy Petry (born 1979), American soldier and Medal of Honor recipient
 Lucile Petry Leone (1902–1999), American nurse
 Michael Petry (born 1960), American artist
 Michael Petry (footballer) (born 1976), German footballer
 Valentin Petry (1928–2016), German racing cyclist
 Wolfgang Petry (born 1951), German musician
 Zsolt Petry (born 1966), Hungarian footballer

See also
 Petri
 Petrie (disambiguation)

Surnames